Leigh Salters (born March 27, 1989) is a Canadian former professional ice hockey player.

Career
Prior to turning professional, Salters played five seasons in the Ontario Hockey League with the Guelph Storm and London Knights. featuring in 250 games, where he scored 34 goals and assisted on 50 others whilst being assessed 379 PIM

In the summer of 2010, San Jose Sharks invited Salters to their pre-season training camp, where he was assigned to their AHL team, Worcester Sharks before being traded to Syracuse Crunch in the AHL where he registered 3 points in 52 games and picked up 111 penalty minutes.  He was assessed 17 fighting majors during the season trying to cement his position on the roster for next season.

At the end of the 2010-11 season, he was released and was subsequently signed by Florida Everblades in the ECHL on May 9, where he would spend the next two seasons, being called up to the Charlotte Checkers once.

Over the two seasons, he would play in 97 games, he would contribute 29 goals and 28 assists whilst picking up 188 penalty minutes.  He fought 15 times over his two seasons in the ECHL,

On June 10, 2013, the Nottingham Panthers of the Elite Ice Hockey League announced the signing of Salters for the upcoming season.  During his time in England, Salters picked up the Nottingham Panthers Supporters Club Player of the Month award for September along with Most Entertaining Player of the Season.  He played in 58 games and scored 26 goals and 33 assists whilst picking up 124 penalty minutes.

For the start of the 2014/15 season Salters signed with Glasgow-based club, the Braehead Clan. Wearing the number 24, Leigh established himself as one of the top hard-hitting forwards in the EIHL by picking up a total of 50 Penalty in Minutes during the month of October alone. On January 17, 2015, Salters scored the 4th goal in a 6–2 win over Gardiner conference rivals Dundee Stars, which was the Braehead Clan's 1,000th goal in all EIHL competitions.

In the 2015-16 season, Salters moved to the Cardiff Devils.

Career statistics

References

External links

1989 births
Living people
Canadian ice hockey left wingers
Charlotte Checkers (2010–) players
Florida Everblades players
Guelph Storm players
Sportspeople from London, Ontario
London Knights players
Syracuse Crunch players
Worcester Sharks players
Nottingham Panthers players
Braehead Clan players
Cardiff Devils players
Ice hockey people from Ontario
Canadian expatriate ice hockey players in England
Canadian expatriate ice hockey players in Scotland
Canadian expatriate ice hockey players in Wales
Canadian expatriate ice hockey players in the United States